Anders Bertil Michael Jormin (born 7 September 1957) is a Swedish bassist and composer.

Jormin established a musical partnership with Bobo Stenson in the mid-1980s which led to international recognition playing with Charles Lloyd, in the early 1990s. In the late 1990s he also performed regularly with Polish trumpeter Tomasz Stańko.

Jorman has played and toured internationally with many musicians including Elvin Jones, Don Cherry, Lee Konitz, Joe Henderson, Paul Motian, Rita Marcotulli, Norma Winstone, Mike Mainieri, Mats Gustafsson, Albert Mangelsdorff, Dino Saluzzi, Marilyn Crispell, and Kenny Wheeler.

Anders Jormin also teaches double bass and improvisation and holds a Professorial post at the Academy of Music and Drama at Gothenburg University since 2002. In 1995 he undertook a visiting professorship at the Sibelius Academy in Helsinki. The same appointed him Doctor honores causa (honorary doctorate) in 2003.

Background
Anders Jormin grew up in a musical family with a father who was a professional jazz musician and learned to perform jazz standards at an early age, he studied classical music on piano and bass at the University of Gothenburg and has a long-standing appreciation of folk music and combines classical music with folk and jazz in his compositional approach. 
Anders Jormin’s brother is the percussionist and pianist Christian Jormin.

Awards and honors
Jormin has received the Jan Johansson Scholarship (1992), Jazz Kannan (1994), and a Swedish Grammy for Best Jazz Album with the Bobo Stenson Trio, Reflections (1996). In November 2010 he was awarded the Swedish Royal Music Academy Jazz Prize.

Discography

As leader
 Nordic Lights (Dragon, 1984)
 Eight Pieces (Dragon)
 Alone (Dragon, 1991)
 Jord (Dragon, 1995)
 Once (Dragon)
 Silvae (Dragon, 1998)
 Xieyi (ECM, 2001)
 In Winds, In Light (ECM, 2003)
 Aviaja (Footprint, 2005)
 Songs in Meantone (Footprint, 2011)
 Ad Lucem (ECM, 2012)
 Provenance (Footprint, 2013)
 Between Always and Never (Swedish Society Discofil, 2014)
 Trees of Light with Lena Willemark and Karin Nakagawa (ECM, 2015)

As sideman
With Don Cherry
Dona Nostra (ECM, 1994)
With Marilyn Crispell
Spring Tour (Alice Musik Produktion, 1995)
With Mark Feldman
What Exit (ECM, 2006)
With Charles Lloyd
Notes from Big Sur (ECM, 1992)
The Call (ECM, 1993)
All My Relations (ECM, 1994)
Canto (ECM, 1996)
With Tomasz Stańko
Matka Joanna (ECM, 1994)
Leosia (ECM, 1996)
From the Green Hill (ECM, 1998)
With Bobo Stenson
Very Early (Dragon)
Reflections (ECM, 1993)
War Orphans (ECM, 1997)
Serenity (ECM, 1999)
Goodbye (ECM, 2004)
Cantando (ECM, 2007)
Indicum (ECM, 2011)
Contra la Indecisión (ECM, 2018)
With Kenny Wheeler

 It Takes Two ! (C.A.M. Jazz – CAMJ 7786-2, 2006)

References

External links
Anders Jormin Homepage
Anders Jormin - "Sound is an image starting inside", Jazzdimensions Interview 2012

1957 births
Living people
20th-century double-bassists
21st-century double-bassists
20th-century bass guitarists
21st-century bass guitarists
Avant-garde jazz double-bassists
Swedish jazz double-bassists
Avant-garde jazz musicians
Swedish bass guitarists
21st-century guitarists